Babylon 5 is an American science fiction television series created, produced and largely written by J. Michael Straczynski. The show centers on the Babylon 5 space station: a focal point for politics, diplomacy, and conflict during the years 2257–2262. With its prominent use of planned story arcs, the series was often described as a "novel for television".

The pilot film premiered on February 22, 1993. The regular series aired from January 26, 1994, and ran for five full seasons. Due to Warner corporate structure and policy concerning syndication in general, and syndication of properties produced by the defunct PTEN division in particular, the show has been syndicated only briefly, and did not appear on U.S. television from 2003 through 2018 (though it has aired in other countries). In 2018, the show began airing nightly on the Comet TV Sci-Fi Network. The show spawned six television films and a spin-off series, Crusade, which aired in 1999 and ran for 13 episodes. On July 31, 2007, a DVD was released containing two short films about selected characters from the series.

The five seasons of the series each correspond to one fictional sequential year in the period 2258–2262. Each season shares its name with an episode that is central to that season's plot. As the series starts, the Babylon 5 station is welcoming ambassadors from various races in the galaxy. Earth has just barely survived an accidental war with the powerful Minbari, who, despite their superior technology, mysteriously surrendered at the brink of the destruction of the human race.

Some episodes in the second season were aired out of their intended chronological sequence. Straczynski confirmed that in Season 2, "A Race Through Dark Places" should precede "Soul Mates," and that "Knives" should precede "In the Shadow of Z'ha'dum."

Series overview

Episodes

Pilot film (1993)

Season 1: Signs and Portents (1994)  
During 2258, Commander Jeffrey Sinclair is in charge of the station, assisted by executive officer Susan Ivanova and security chief Michael Garibaldi. The season traces his gradual recollection of his capture by the Minbari during their war with humans. The Minbari came to believe that Sinclair carried the soul of Valen, a revered Minbari leader. Inferring that Minbari souls were being reborn as humans, the Minbari surrendered to avoid further fratricide. This action is a source of internal strife between some Minbari.

Meanwhile, tensions between the Centauri Republic, an empire in decline, and the Narn Regime, a former Centauri dominion which successfully rebelled, are increasing. Seeking for his people to regain their former prominence, Mollari makes a deal with a mysterious ally, Mr. Morden, to strike back at the Narn. On Earth, some humans resent the influence of aliens, and seek to eliminate them from Earth-owned property, including Babylon 5.

Minbari Ambassador Delenn is revealed to belong to the Grey Council, the Minbari ruling body. She eventually transforms into a Minbari/human hybrid, ostensibly to build a bridge between the humans and Minbari. The year ends with the death of Earth Alliance president Luis Santiago, which the staff of Babylon 5 believe to have been an assassination.

Season 2: The Coming of Shadows (1994–1995)  
Captain John Sheridan assumes the military governance of the station after Sinclair is reassigned, without explanation, to Minbar. He and the command staff discover that now-president Morgan Clark arranged the assassination of President Santiago. Conflict develops between the Babylon 5 command staff and the Psi Corps, an increasingly autocratic organization which oversees and controls the lives of human telepaths.

Ambassador Mollari, in preparation for the death of the ailing Centauri Emperor, works with Lord Refa to assassinate any challengers to the throne, while continuing to utilize Mr. Morden and his "associates"—the Shadows—against the Narn. When the emperor dies, Mollari and Refa place the emperor's unstable nephew, Cartagia, on the throne. Through him they instigate full-scale war with the Narn, using weapons of mass destruction to conquer the Narn homeworld.

Earth's government becomes more totalitarian, suppressing dissent and broadcasting propaganda. Kosh and other Vorlons approach Sheridan and reveal themselves to be the enemies of the Shadows, asking for Sheridan's help to fight them.

Season 3: Point of No Return (1995–1996)  
Earth's government continues to become more xenophobic, while on Babylon 5, Sheridan and Delenn, who become romantically involved during the course of the season, create a "conspiracy of light" to try to reveal the truth behind the Shadows' influence. Historically tense relations between Earth and its Mars colony reach breaking point when Mars declares independence and Earth's government declares martial law and attacks. Sheridan, outraged, withdraws Babylon 5 from the Earth Alliance, supported by the Minbari.

The fate of Babylon 4 is discovered when Sinclair returns to the station to request Sheridan's help: Sinclair had been destined to use time travel to take Babylon 4 back in time to the previous Minbari-Shadow war, where he is transformed into the revered Minbari leader, Valen, using the same device Delenn used for her transformation.

Ambassador Mollari realizes his deal with the Shadows has become dangerous and tries to sever ties with Mr. Morden, but fails. Kosh informs Sheridan that the Shadows can be fought with telepaths. The Vorlons attack the Shadows at Sheridan's insistence, but the Shadows kill Kosh in retaliation.

Sheridan's wife, presumed dead on an archaeological dig on the planet Z'ha'dum years earlier, arrives at the station and convinces Sheridan to accompany her to Z'ha'dum. The Shadows attempt to force Sheridan to join their cause, their ships threatening Babylon 5. Sheridan, guided by Kosh's words, flies a vessel loaded with explosives into the planet while jumping into a large chasm. The Shadow ships withdraw, but Garibaldi, deployed to defend the station, does not return.

Season 4: No Surrender, No Retreat (1996–1997)  
Sheridan returns from Z'ha'dum with the help of a strange being known as Lorien, who has given Sheridan 20 more years to live. The Vorlons alarm the other races when they begin destroying entire planets that have been influenced by the Shadows. Mollari, fearing the Vorlons will destroy Centauri Prime, destroys the Shadow base there and executes Mr. Morden. Sheridan learns that the Vorlons and Shadows were tasked as caretakers for younger races in the galaxy, but due to profound differences in ideology have been at war for eons, using the younger races as pawns in a proxy war. With the help of other ancient races, Sheridan convinces the Vorlons and Shadows to leave and cease interfering with the younger races.

Garibaldi returns to Babylon 5, with no explanation for his disappearance. He has unexplained changes in behavior and distances himself from the command staff, resigning and relocating to Mars to work with tycoon William Edgars. He also subdues Sheridan, allowing the latter to be kidnapped. It is revealed that Garibaldi was co-opted by the Psi-Corps to spy on Edgars, who is found to be developing a virus to destroy telepaths.

With the Vorlons and Shadows gone, Earth's totalitarian government attempts to use the captured Sheridan as a propaganda tool, but Garibaldi - now free from Psi-Corps influence - rescues him. A brief civil war breaks out on Earth, culminating in President Clark's suicide and Sheridan's surrender to Earth forces. Ivanova is critically injured in the war, and leaves the station to take command of her own vessel.

The League of Non-Aligned Worlds are reorganized into an Interstellar Alliance with Earth, Minbar, Narn, and Centauri acting as a United Nations across the galaxy, with the Rangers as their enforcers. Sheridan is made president of the Alliance, and he and Delenn marry.

Season 5: The Wheel of Fire (1998)  
In 2262, Earthforce Captain Elizabeth Lochley is appointed to command Babylon 5, which is now also the headquarters of the Interstellar Alliance. A conflict arises between Psi-Corps and a group of rogue telepaths that are seeking their own homeworld after learning that the Vorlons created telepaths as weapons against the Shadows. When several telepaths martyr themselves, Lyta leads attacks against the Psi-Corps, becoming an enemy of the state.

Meanwhile, Alliance trade and civilian ships are being attacked by an unknown force, and evidence is discovered that the Centauri may be involved. Mollari discovers that the Drakh, a Shadow-allied race, have forced the Centauri leadership to precipitate war with the Alliance, in part as revenge for Mollari's turn against the Shadows. Mollari is forced to co-operate when he becomes Emperor, and withdraws the Centauri from the Alliance. Vir becomes the Centauri ambassador on the station.

Separate stories show the long-standing members of Babylon 5 making plans to leave the station: Sheridan and Delenn move to the Alliance's permanent headquarters on Minbar. Garibaldi, having relapsed in his alcoholism, is aided by Lise, and the two marry and return to Mars. Dr. Franklin takes a position on Earth as head of xenobiology. G'Kar discovers he has become a religious figure, and unable to stay on the station or return to Narn, exiles himself to travel the galaxy, taking Lyta with him since she is in a similar position.

Twenty years after his return from Z'ha'dum, Sheridan feels his life fading. He has the Rangers gather his old friends on Minbar for a farewell party. The next day, Sheridan attempts to leave while Delenn is asleep, but she stops him to say a final goodbye. Alone, Sheridan revisits Babylon 5, now being decommissioned, before continuing to the location of the final Vorlon/Shadow encounter. Drawing his last breaths, he is met by Lorien, who invites Sheridan to travel beyond the galactic rim. Sheridan's ship is found adrift and empty some days later.

Television films

Babylon 5: The Lost Tales 
Babylon 5: The Lost Tales is a direct-to-DVD production. The DVD contains two 35-minute episodes, each focusing on a particular character. See Babylon 5: The Lost Tales.

See also 

 List of Crusade episodes
 The Lurker's Guide to Babylon 5

References and notes 

 
Lists of American science fiction television series episodes

it:Episodi di Babylon 5 (prima stagione)